Mitophagy is the selective degradation of mitochondria by autophagy. It often occurs to defective mitochondria following damage or stress. The process of mitophagy was first described over a hundred years ago by Margaret Reed Lewis and Warren Harmon Lewis. Ashford and Porter used electron microscopy to observe mitochondrial fragments in liver lysosomes by 1962, and a 1977 report suggested that "mitochondria develop functional alterations which would activate autophagy." The term "mitophagy" was in use by 1998.

Mitophagy is key in keeping the cell healthy. It promotes turnover of mitochondria and prevents accumulation of dysfunctional mitochondria which can lead to cellular degeneration. It is mediated by Atg32 (in yeast) and NIX and its regulator BNIP3 in mammals. Mitophagy is regulated by PINK1 and parkin proteins. In addition to the selective removal of damaged mitochondria, mitophagy is also required to adjust mitochondrial numbers to changing cellular metabolic needs, for steady-state mitochondrial turnover, and during certain cellular developmental stages, such as during cellular differentiation of red blood cells.

Role 
Organelles and bits of cytoplasm are sequestered and targeted for degradation by the lysosome for hydrolytic digestion by a process known as autophagy. Mitochondria metabolism leads to the creation of by-products that lead to DNA damage and mutations. Therefore, a healthy population of mitochondria is critical for the well-being of cells. Previously it was thought that targeted degradation of mitochondria was a stochastic event, but accumulating evidence suggest that mitophagy is a selective process.

Generation of ATP by oxidative phosphorylation leads to the production of various reactive oxygen species (ROS) in the mitochondria, and submitochondrial particles. Formation of ROS as a mitochondrial waste product will eventually lead to cytotoxicity and cell death. Because of their role in metabolism, mitochondria are very susceptible to ROS damage. Damaged mitochondria cause a depletion in ATP and a release of cytochrome c, which leads to activation of caspases and onset of apoptosis. Mitochondrial damage is not caused solely by oxidative stress or disease processes; normal mitochondria will eventually accumulate oxidative damage hallmarks overtime, which can be deleterious to mitochondria as well as to the cell. These faulty mitochondria can further deplete the cell of ATP, increase production of ROS, and release proapoptopic proteins such as caspases.

Because of the danger of having damaged mitochondria in the cell, the timely elimination of damaged and aged mitochondria is essential for maintaining the integrity of the cell. This turnover process consists of the sequestration and hydrolytic degradation by the lysosome, a process also known as mitophagy.

Mitochondrial depletion reduces a spectrum of senescence effectors and phenotypes while preserving ATP production via enhanced glycolysis.

Pathways

In mammals 
There are several pathways by which mitophagy is induced in mammalian cells. The PINK1 and Parkin pathway is, so far, the best characterized. This pathway starts by deciphering the difference between healthy mitochondria and damaged mitochondria. A 64-kDa protein, PTEN-induced kinase 1 (PINK1), has been implicated to detect mitochondrial quality. PINK1 contains a mitochondrial targeting sequence (MTS) and is recruited to the mitochondria. In healthy mitochondria, PINK1 is imported through the outer membrane via the TOM complex, and partially through the inner mitochondrial membrane via the TIM complex, so it then spans the inner mitochondrial membrane. The process of import into the inner membrane is associated with the cleavage of PINK1 from 64-kDa into a 60-kDa form. PINK1 is then cleaved by PARL into a 52-kDa form. This new form of PINK1 is degraded by proteases within the mitochondria. This keeps the concentration of PINK1 in check in healthy mitochondria.

In unhealthy mitochondria, the inner mitochondrial membrane becomes depolarized. This membrane potential is necessary for the TIM-mediated protein import. In depolarized mitochondria, PINK1 is no longer imported into the inner membrane, is not cleaved by PARL and PINK1 concentration increases in the outer mitochondrial membrane. PINK1 can then recruit Parkin, a cytosolic E3 ubiquitin ligase. It is thought that PINK1 phosphorylates Parkin ubiquitin ligase at S65 which initiates Parkin recruitment at the mitochondria. The phosphorylation site of Parkin, at S65, is homologous to the site where ubiquitin is phosphorylated. This phosphorylation activates Parkin by inducing dimerization, an active state. This allows for Parkin-mediated ubiquitination on other proteins.

Because of its PINK1-mediated recruitment to the mitochondrial surface, Parkin can ubiquitylate proteins in the outer mitochondrial membrane. Some of these proteins include Mfn1/Mfn2 and mitoNEET. The ubiquitylation of mitochondrial surface proteins brings in mitophagy initiating factors. Parkin promotes ubiquitin chain linkages on both K63 and K48. K48 ubiquitination initiates degradation of the proteins, and could allow for passive mitochondrial degradation. K63 ubiquitination is thought to recruit autophagy adaptors LC3/GABARAP which will then lead to mitophagy. It is still unclear which proteins are necessary and sufficient for mitophagy, and how these proteins, once ubiquitylated, initiate mitophagy.

Other pathways that can induce mitophagy includes mitophagy receptors on the outer mitochondrial membrane surface. These receptors include NIX1, BNIP3 and FUNDC1. All of these receptors contain LIR consensus sequences that bind LC3/GABARAP which can lead to the degradation of the mitochondria. In hypoxic conditions BNIP3 is upregulated by HIF1α. BNIP3 is then phosphorylated at its serine residues near the LIR sequence which promotes LC3 binding. FUNDCI is also hypoxia sensitive, although it is constitutively present at the outer mitochondrial membrane during normal conditions 

In neurons, mitochondria are distributed unequally throughout the cell to areas where energy demand is high, like at synapses and Nodes of Ranvier. This distribution is maintained largely by motor protein-mediated mitochondrial transport along the axon. While neuronal mitophagy is thought to occur primarily in the cell body, it also occurs locally in the axon at sites distant from the cell body; in both the cell body and the axon, neuronal mitophagy occurs via the PINK1-Parkin pathway. Mitophagy in the nervous system may also occur transcellularly, where damaged mitochondria in retinal ganglion cell axons can be passed to neighboring astrocytes for degradation. This process is known as transmitophagy.

In yeast 
Mitophagy in yeast was first presumed after the discovery of Yeast Mitochondrial Escape genes (yme), specifically yme1. Yme1 like other genes in the family showed increase escape of mtDNA, but was the only one that showed an increase in mitochondrial degradation. Through work on this gene which mediates the escape of mtDNA, researchers discovered that mitochondrial turnover is triggered by proteins.

More was discovered about genetic control of mitophagy after studies on the protein UTH1. After performing a screen for genes that regulate longevity, it was found in ΔUTH1 strains that there was an inhibition of mitophagy, which occurred without affecting autophagy mechanisms. This study also showed that the Uth1p protein is necessary to move mitochondria to the vacuole. This suggested there is a specialized system for mitophagy.  Other studies looked at AUP1, a mitochondrial phosphatase, and found Aup1 marks mitochondria for elimination.

Another yeast protein associated with mitophagy is a mitochondrial inner membrane protein, Mdm38p/Mkh1p. This protein is part of the complex that exchanges K+/H+ ions across the inner membrane. Deletions in this protein causes swelling, a loss of membrane potential, and mitochondrial fragmentation.

Recently, it has been shown that ATG32 (autophagy related gene 32) plays a crucial role in yeast mitophagy. It is localized to the mitochondria. Once mitophagy is initiated, Atg32 binds to Atg11 and the Atg32-associated mitochondria are transported to the vacuole. Atg32 silencing stops recruitment of autophagy machinery and mitochondrial degradation. Atg32 is not necessary for other forms of autophagy.

All of these proteins likely play a role in maintaining healthy mitochondria, but mutations have shown that dysregulation can lead to a selective degradation of mitochondria. Whether these proteins work in concert, are main players in mitophagy, or members in a larger network to control autophagy still remains to be elucidated.

Relation to disease

Cancer
As of 2020, the role of mitophagy in cancer is not fully understood. Some models of mitophagy, such as PINK1 or BNIP3-mediated mitophagy, have been associated with tumor suppression in humans and mice. Mitophagy associated with NIX, in contrast, is associated with tumor promotion. In 1920 Otto Warburg observed that certain cancerous tumors display a metabolic shift towards glycolysis. This is referred to as the "Warburg effect", in which cancer cells produce energy via the conversion of glucose into lactate, even in the presence of oxygen (aerobic glycolysis). Despite nearly a century since it was first described, a lot of questions remained unanswered regarding the Warburg effect. Initially, Warburg attributed this metabolic shift to mitochondrial dysfunction in cancer cells. Further studies in tumor biology have shown that the increased growth rate in cancer cells is due to an overdrive in glycolysis (glycolytic shift), which leads to a decrease in oxidative phosphorylation and mitochondrial density. As a consequence of the Warburg effect, cancer cells would produce large amounts of lactate. The excess lactate is then released to the extracellular environment which results in a decrease in extracellular pH. This micro-environment acidification can lead to cellular stress, which would lead to autophagy. Autophagy is activated in response to a range of stimuli, including nutrient depletion, hypoxia, and activated oncogenes. However, it appears that autophagy can help in cancer cell survival under conditions of metabolic stress and it may confer resistance to anti-cancer therapies such as radiation and chemotherapy. Additionally, in the microenvironment of cancer cells, there is an increase in hypoxia-inducible transcription factor 1-alpha (HIF1A), which promotes expression of BNIP3, an essential factor for mitophagy.

Parkinson's disease
Parkinson's disease is a neurodegenerative disorder pathologically characterized by death of the dopamine-producing neurons in the substantia nigra. There are several genetic mutations implicated in Parkinson's disease, including loss of function PINK1  and Parkin. Loss of function in either of these genes results in the accumulation of damaged mitochondria, and aggregation of proteins or inclusion bodies – eventually leading to neuronal death.

Mitochondria dysfunction is thought to be involved in Parkinson's disease pathogenesis. In spontaneous, usually aging related Parkinson's disease (non-genetically linked), the disease is commonly caused by dysfunctional mitochondria, cellular oxidative stress, autophagic alterations and the aggregation of proteins. These can lead to mitochondrial swelling and depolarization. It is important to keep the dysfunctional mitochondria regulated, because all of these traits could be induced by mitochondrial dysfunction and can induce cell death. Disorders in energy creation by mitochondria can cause cellular degeneration, like those seen in the substantia nigra.

Tuberculosis
Tuberculosis is a contagious disease caused by infection with the airborne pathogen Mycobacterium tuberculosis. Recent investigation has shown that chronic infection by Mycobacterium tuberculosis in the lungs or ex-vivo infection by non-pathogenic mycobacteria (M.bovis) elicits activation of the receptor-mediated pathway for mitophagy. Here the receptor mediated mitophagy pathways are elicited through NIX that gets upregulated during M. tuberculosis infection. Elicited NIX/BNIP3L receptor recruitment of LC3 molecules mediating formation of phagophore that engulf defective mitochondria directly

References 

Cell biology